Chung Chi Lok (born January 23, 1972) is a Hong Kong sprint canoer who competed in the early 1990s. At the 1992 Summer Olympics in Barcelona, he was eliminated in the repechages of both the K-2 500 m and the K-2 1000 m event.

External links
Sports-Reference.com profile

1972 births
Hong Kong people
Canoeists at the 1992 Summer Olympics
Hong Kong male canoeists
Living people
Olympic canoeists of Hong Kong